Hackbarth is a surname. Notable people with the surname include:

 Otto Hackbarth (1886–1967), American golfer and club maker
 Rudolph Hackbarth (born 1994), Brazilian handball player
 Tom Hackbarth (born 1951), American politician
 Violet Hackbarth (1919–1988), American baseball player